Chiara Mair (born 31 August 1996) is an Austrian alpine skier.

Career
In her career she has won two medals at youth level at the World Junior Alpine Skiing Championships 2017. Her best result in the World Cup is a 4th place in Slalom in Schladming in January 2022.

References

External links
 

1996 births
Living people
Austrian female alpine skiers